Instructions for Survival is a German documentary film, directed by Yana Ugrekhelidze and released in 2021. The film is a portrait of Alexander, a trans man  who must carefully navigate secrecy about his gender identity while he and his wife undertake efforts to migrate to a safer country.

The film premiered in the Perspektive Deutsches Kino program at the 71st Berlin International Film Festival, where it won the Jury Award from the Teddy Award program for LGBTQ-related films. It was subsequently screened in the United States at the Ann Arbor Film Festival in April, where it won the award for Best Documentary Film, and in Canada at the Inside Out Film and Video Festival in May.

References

External links
 

2021 films
2021 documentary films
2021 LGBT-related films
German documentary films
German LGBT-related films
2020s Georgian-language films
Transgender-related documentary films
Films shot in Georgia (country)
Films about trans men
Films about immigration